"Why Must We Wait Until Tonight" is a song performed by recording artist Tina Turner for her 1993 What's Love Got to Do with It soundtrack album. The track was written and produced by Bryan Adams and Robert John "Mutt" Lange and peaked at number 16 in the United Kingdom.

Critical reception
Larry Flick from Billboard described "Why Must We Wait Until Tonight" as "a pleading ballad, that derives much of its drama and intensity from La Tina's incomparable vocal style." He added, "Plunking piano/synth riffs click over a shuffling and percussive beat, with just a subtle touch of Hammond organ here and there to provide a blues subtext." Troy J. Augusto from Cashbox stated that it is "a showcase for Turner's vocal prowess and should see no resistance at hit or adult radio formats." He also complimented the songwriters for "giving the ballad a dramatic grandeur that few could handle. Turner, of course, pulls it off with ease, the result is one of her most accessible single releases ever." 

A reviewer from The Daily Vault deemed "the sensuous rendering" as "almost as good", as "What's Love Got to Do With It". Dave Sholin from the Gavin Report commented, "The lyrics speak of fine wine, something that defines Tina Turner's amazing artistry—which just keeps getting better. Writers/producers Bryan Adams and Mutt Lange give her the words and the melody and she does the rest. By the way, if you're one of the few who haven't seen the movie What's Love Got To Do With It yet, do it tonight!" Alan Jones from Music Week rated the song four out of five, stating that the singer "offers one of her more relaxed vocal performances" on a "pleasant" ballad.

Track listings
 European and Japanese CD single; UK 7-inch and cassette single
 "Why Must We Wait Until Tonight?" (7-inch edit) – 4:30
 "Shake a Tail Feather" (album version) – 2:32

 European and Australian CD maxi-single; European and UK 12-inch single
 "Why Must We Wait Until Tonight?" (single edit) – 4:31
 "Why Must We Wait Until Tonight?" (full remix) – 5:24
 "Why Must We Wait Until Tonight?" (album version) – 5:53
 "Shake a Tail Feather" – 2:32

 UK CD maxi-single
 "Why Must We Wait Until Tonight?" (album version) – 5:53
 "The Best" (Jimmy Barnes Version) – 4:13
 "Shake a Tail Feather" (album version) – 2:34
 "Why Must We Wait Until Tonight?" (remix) – 5:23

 US 7-inch and cassette single
 "Why Must We Wait Until Tonight?" – 5:53
 "Shake a Tail Feather" – 2:32

 US CD maxi-single
 "Why Must We Wait Until Tonight?" (7-inch edit) – 4:30
 "Why Must We Wait Until Tonight?" (Tony Dofat remix) – 5:23
 "Why Must We Wait Until Tonight?" (LP version) – 5:51
 "Why Must We Wait Until Tonight?" (Tony Dofat piano/drums/vocals only) – 5:16
 "Shake a Tail Feather" – 2:32
 "Why Must We Wait Until Tonight?" (acappella) – 4:28

Charts

Release history

References

Tina Turner songs
1990s ballads
1993 singles
1993 songs
Parlophone singles
Song recordings produced by Robert John "Mutt" Lange
Songs written by Bryan Adams
Songs written by Robert John "Mutt" Lange
Virgin Records singles